Route 116 is a  state highway entirely within Ridgefield, Connecticut that runs from the Ridgefield town center at Route 35 to the New York state line, where New York State Route 116 continues towards the hamlet of North Salem.

Route description
Route 116 begins in downtown Ridgefield, splitting off from Main Street (Route 35). While Route 35 heads northeast towards downtown Danbury, Route 116 heads northwest along North Salem Road towards the New York state line. North Salem Road travels through the more rural areas of Ridgefield. North Salem Road reaches Mamanasco Lake about  later where it also intersects with Ridgebury Road, which leads to the Ridgebury section of town and to the old Union Carbide center in western Danbury. Route 116 then passes by the Ridgefield High School and Scotts Ridge Middle School after another . Route 116 continues along North Salem Road for another  where it crosses the state line and becomes New York State Route 116. For its entire length in Ridgefield, Route 116 is designated the Elizabeth M. Leonard Memorial Highway.

History
In the 1920s, the Ridgefield to North Salem route was a primary state highway designated as Highway 146. In the 1932 state highway renumbering, Highway 146 became incorporated into the newly established Route 33. In 1966, Route 33 was shortened to end at Route 35 in Ridgefield center and the  piece west of Route 35 was renumbered to Route 116 in order to match the route number in New York.

Major intersections

References

116
Transportation in Fairfield County, Connecticut
Ridgefield, Connecticut